Kristiene Gong (born March 22, 1993) is an American figure skater.

Career
Gong competed internationally for the United States in the 2009-2010 and 2010-2011 cycles.  She qualified for the 2011 ISU Junior Grand Prix Final in Beijing, China after finishing in the top 4 at her two previous international competitions in Romania and Great Britain. Gong is currently studying Political Science at Northeastern University in Boston.

Programs

Competitive highlights

 Ju = Juvenile level; J = Junior level.

Detailed results

 SP= Short program; FS= Free skate.

External links

Living people
American female single skaters
1993 births
People from Lake Arrowhead, California
21st-century American women